is the seventh studio album by Japanese singer/songwriter Chisato Moritaka, released on November 18, 1992 by Warner Music Japan. Named after a small music hall (itself named after the orchestral piece from Yellow Submarine) in Kumamoto where Moritaka started playing music, the album marked a shift in musical direction in her career, as she became more engaged in playing musical instruments such as drums, rhythm guitar, bass, and piano. It also has a more stripped-down sound in comparison to Moritaka's previous albums. Pepperland is the only studio album in Moritaka's catalog to not have any singles.

The album reached No. 5 on Oricon's albums chart and sold over 197,000 copies. It was also certified Gold by the RIAJ.

Track listing

Personnel 
 Chisato Moritaka – vocals, drums, piano, rhythm guitar, acoustic guitar, bass (all tracks except where indicated)
 Yuichi Takahashi – guitar (1–4, 7–9), bass (2–3, 8), backing vocals (2–4, 8)
 Shin Kōno – guitar (1), Fender Rhodes (7)
 Yukio Seto – guitar (3)
 Izutsuya – guitar (4, 7, 9–10)
 Masataro Naoe – guitar, synthesizer (10)
 Hiroyoshi Matsuo – guitar (11)
 Yasuaki Maejima – Fender Rhodes, synthesizer (6)
 Hideo Saitō – synthesizer (9)
 Yukie Matsuo – Fender Rhodes (11)
 Masafumi Yokoyama – bass (7, 10)

Charts

Certification

References

External links 
 
 
 

1992 albums
Chisato Moritaka albums
Japanese-language albums
Warner Music Japan albums